Albany Fire Department may refer to:

 Albany Fire Department (Georgia), fire department for the city of Albany in Georgia
 Albany Fire Department (New York), fire department for the city of Albany in New York